New Prospect is located in the town of Auburn, in Fond du Lac County, Wisconsin, United States.

Images

Notes

Unincorporated communities in Wisconsin
Unincorporated communities in Fond du Lac County, Wisconsin